Pellucida is a genus of fungi in the family Hyponectriaceae. This is a monotypic genus, containing the single species Pellucida pendulina.

References

External links
Index Fungorum

Xylariales
Monotypic Ascomycota genera